Łagów-Sulęcin Landscape Park (Łagowsko-Sulęciński Park Krajobrazowy) is a protected area (Landscape Park) in western Poland, established in 1985, covering an area of .

The park lies within Lubusz Voivodeship, in Sulęcin County, (Gmina Sulęcin) and Świebodzin County (Gmina Łagów).

Within the Landscape Park are three nature reserves.

External links 
Łagów-Sulęcin Landscape Park

Landscape parks in Poland
Parks in Lubusz Voivodeship
Sulęcin County
Świebodzin County